The Brown Beast is a 1914 German silent film directed by Harry Piel and starring Ludwig Trautmann and Hedda Vernon.

Cast
 Ludwig Trautmann
 Hedda Vernon

References

Bibliography

External links

1914 films
Films based on works by Edgar Allan Poe
Films of the German Empire
Films directed by Harry Piel
German silent feature films
German black-and-white films
1910s German films